Bennachie was the name of two ships operated by the Ben Line (Ben Line Steamers Ltd):

, sold to Liberia in 1964
, scrapped in 1971

Ship names